Ħ (minuscule: ħ) is a letter of the Latin alphabet, derived from H with the addition of a bar. It is used in Maltese for a voiceless pharyngeal fricative consonant (corresponding to the letter heth of Semitic abjads:). Lowercase  is used in the International Phonetic Alphabet for the same sound.

In Unicode, the special character ℏ (U+210F), represents the reduced Planck constant of quantum mechanics. In this context, it is pronounced "h-bar".

The lowercase resembles the Cyrillic letter Tshe (ћ), or the astronomical symbol of Saturn (♄).

A white uppercase Ħ on a red square was the logo of Heritage Malta until 2022.  

It is used as the symbol for Hedera Hashgraph's native cryptocurrency, HBAR.

Computer encoding
As a part of WGL-4, Ħ should be displayable on most computers.

See also
 Ĥ

References

Maltese language
H stroke
H stroke